Mahilyow (Mogilev) Airport  is an airport that serves Mogilev, Belarus.

Airlines and destinations
As of December 2021, there are no regular scheduled services at the airport.

External links
 Mahilyow airport at ourairports.com database
 

Airports built in the Soviet Union
Airports in Belarus
Buildings and structures in Mogilev
Buildings and structures in Mogilev Region